Willem Schuth (born 14 June 1954 in Assen) is a Dutch politician and former Member of the European Parliament for Germany with the Free Democratic Party of Germany, part of the Alliance of Liberals and Democrats for Europe and sits on the European Parliament's Committee on Agriculture and Rural Development.

He is a substitute for the Committee on Transport and Tourism, a member of the Delegation for relations with Switzerland, Iceland and Norway and to the European Economic Area (EEA) Joint Parliamentary Committee and a substitute for the Delegation to the EU-Turkey Joint Parliamentary Committee.

Education
 1975-1976 military service in the Netherlands
 1977-1979 worked in the Netherlands Defence Ministry
 1979-2004 Netherlands Defence Ministry official, Seedorf Barracks, Germany
 1996: Joined the FDP
 since 1998 Elbe-Weser FDP District Vice-Chairman
 since 2001 Member of the Federal Committee on International Policy
 since 2002 Member of the Lower Saxony FDP Regional Executive
 since 2003 Member of the ELDR Council
 Member of the Naturschutzbund Deutschland (NABU) (nature conservation)

External links
 
 
 

1954 births
Living people
MEPs for Germany 2004–2009
People from Assen